Elena Franchi (born 26 August 1996) is an Italian professional racing cyclist, who currently rides for UCI Women's Continental Team .

See also
 List of 2015 UCI Women's Teams and riders

References

External links

1996 births
Living people
Italian female cyclists
Place of birth missing (living people)
21st-century Italian women